Aristotelia adenostomae is a moth of the family Gelechiidae. It was described by Keifer in 1933. It is found in North America, where it has been recorded from California.

The length of the forewings is 4.3–6 mm. 

The larvae feed on Adenostoma fasciculatum.

References

Moths described in 1933
Aristotelia (moth)
Moths of North America